"Ceres series", after Ceres, the goddess of growing plants, may mean any of several series of postage stamps:

 Ceres series (France)
 Ceres series (Portugal)
 Ceres of Corrientes (Argentina)